Missing Men of Saturn is a juvenile science fiction novel, published first in 1953, by astronomer and author Robert S. Richardson (as Philip Latham) with cover illustration by Alex Schomburg. The story concerns Dale Sutton's mission to the dreaded planet Saturn from which no one has ever returned. Missing Men of Saturn is a part of the Winston Science Fiction set, a series of juvenile novels which have become famous for their influence on young science fiction readers and their exceptional cover illustrations by award-winning artists.

Plot introduction
Dale Sutton, a recent graduate from the Space Academy, is assigned to the Albatross, a decrepit old spaceship. When the Albatross is assigned to explore the mysterious ringed planet Saturn, Dale remembers the story of Captain Dearborn who had commanded the first and last mission to Saturn. When the Albatross reaches Saturn's moon Titan, the superstitious fears of the crew are realized as equipment begins to disappear, and eventually people.

Reception
New York Times reviewer Villiers Gerson praised the novel as "an excellent tale." P. Schuyler Miller identified it as the best of the early run of Winston juveniles, citing both its scientific accuracy and the relatively realistic stature of its hero.

Characters in "Missing Men of Saturn"
 Dale Sutton - Recent graduate of Space Academy where he was a "big man on campus", sent on expedition to Saturn.

Publication history
1953, United States, The John C. Winston Company, Pub date 1953, Hardback

References

1953 American novels
American science fiction novels
Children's science fiction novels
1953 science fiction novels
Fiction set on Titan (moon)
Space exploration novels